Carole Itter (b. September 29, 1939 ) is a Canadian artist, writer, performer and filmmaker.

Life 
Itter attended the Vancouver School of Art in 1961, which was renamed as the Emily Carr Institute of Art and Design in 1978 and then renamed again to the Emily Carr University of Art and Design in 2008. She later became an instructor at the university. She attended the L'Accademia di Bella Arti in Rome in 1964. Itter lived with her partner, Al Neil, in a structure known as The Blue Cabin, originally built in 1932 and located near Cates Park in North Vancouver. The Blue Cabin was restored and moved to False Creek to serve as a floating artist-in-residency in 2019.

Career 
Itter's sculptures, assemblages, collages, installations, performances and writings are strongly influenced by the people and places where she has lived, and frequently reflect social and political issues. She herself is represented in the collections of the Vancouver Art Gallery, the Vancouver Public Library and the Canada Council Art Bank.

Art 
Itter's 1972 piece, Personal Baggage has been described as a key work in Vancouver art. This piece acted to shift art from the gallery setting into the physical world by removing a cedar log from Roberts Creek, British Columbia, disassembling it, and then transporting it to Lockeport, Nova Scotia where it was reassembled. This process was documented by Itter and published in a book entitled The Log's Log.

Her 1979 photo series Euclid, documents her partner, Al Neil, tracing geometric figures in the sand of Cates Park in North Vancouver. These photographs were then projected onto one of Neil's live piano performances and used as cover art for his album Fog and Boot.

In 1994, Itter collaborated with Luke Blackstone and Al Neil on her installation of found objects emerging from an antique organ that were painted and gilded for her exhibit Where the Streets are Paved with Gold: A Tribute to a Canadian Immigrant Neighbourhood. Itter claimed she was inspired by immigrants in her Vancouver community who shared their experiences of Canada with her, calling it "a place where the streets were paved with gold."

Writing 
In 1972, Itter had a daughter, Lara, with Vancouver poet, Gerry Gilbert. After battling depression for many years, Lara Gilbert died by suicide in 1995. Itter edited Lara's extensive journals and published them under Lara's name in I Might Be Nothing.
With Daphne Marlatt, Itter compiled and edited a history of Vancouver's Strathcona neighbourhood titled Opening Doors: Vancouver's East End. Their book was republished as Opening Doors in Vancouver's East End in 2011.  Other works by Itter include The Log's Log  and Whistle Daughter Whistle. Her writing has also been featured in literary magazines such as Room of One's Own.

Selected awards
In 1989 Itter received the VIVA (Vancouver Institute of Visual Arts) Award. In 2017 she received the Audain Prize in Visual Art.

Selected exhibitions

 1984, Rattles, Western Front
 1991, Carole Itter: Where the Streets are Paved with Gold: A Tribute to a Canadian Immigrant Neighbourhood, Vancouver Art Gallery
 1994, Carole Itter: Desolate Combination of Objects, Pitt Gallery
 1995, The Float, Or Gallery
 1999, The Pink Room, grunt gallery
 2007, Metallic: A Fish Film, grunt gallery
 2008, WACK! Art and the Feminist Revolution, Vancouver Art Gallery
 2013, The Piano, Art Gallery of Alberta
2015, The Poetics of Space, Vancouver Art Gallery
2015-16, Between Object and Action, Transforming Media in the 1960s and 70s, Vancouver Art Gallery
2019, Beginning with the Seventies: Radial Change, Morris and Helen Belkin Art Gallery
2020, Art at Home Live, Vancouver Art Gallery

References

External links 
 Memory BC, Lara Gilbert Fonds
 Ruins in Process: Vancouver Art in the Sixties / People, Carole Itter

1939 births
Living people
20th-century Canadian women artists
Artists from Vancouver
Canadian conceptual artists
Canadian women sculptors
Emily Carr University of Art and Design alumni
Women conceptual artists
21st-century Canadian women artists